Hernesaari (until 2013 known as Munkkisaari / Munkholmen) is a quarter in Helsinki, Finland.

See also 
 Hietalahti shipyard

References 

Quarters of Helsinki
Länsisatama